Aizawa (相沢 "fellow swamp") is a Japanese surname.  Alternate writings include 相澤 ("fellow swamp"), 藍澤 ("indigo swamp") and 藍沢 ("indigo swamp"). Notable people with the surname include:

, Japanese woman who killed her father
, Japanese manga artist
Hiroyasu Aizawa (born 1961), retired Japanese ski jumper
, Japanese gravure idol and race queen
, Japanese voice actress
Kiyoharu Aizawa, Japanese engineer
, Japanese voice actress and singer
, Japanese women's footballer
, Japanese badminton player
, Japanese actress and gravure idol
, Japanese soldier who assassinated Tetsuzan Nagata
, Japanese model and television personality
, Japanese composer, creator
, Japanese baseball player
, Japanese scholar, author of the New Theses, promoter of Japanese national essentialism

Fictional characters
, a character in Dai Sentai Goggle V
, a character in the anime series Absolute Boy
Chitose Aizawa, a character in the 3rd game of the dating sim series Tokimeki Memorial
, a character in the manga series Ai Yori Aoshi
, a character in the manga series Tomo-chan Is a Girl!
Itsuki Aizawa, a character in the manga series Warriors of Tao
, a character in the manga series The Knight in the Area
, a character in the manga series G-Taste
, a character in the manga series Wangan Midnight
Kenji Aizawa, a character in the film Tokyo Drifter
, a character in the manga series Nabari no Ou
, a character in the manga Girl Got Game
Miki Aizawa, a character in the film Jushin Thunder Liger: Fist of Thunder
, a character in the manga series Tokyo Mew Mew
, a character in the manga series Great Teacher Onizuka
Orie Aizawa, a character in the manga series Epotoransu! Mai
, a character in the light novel series Suki na Mono wa Suki Dakara Shōganai!
, a character in the manga series Mahoraba
, a character in the visual novel Soul Link
, a character in the manga series Figure 17
, a character in the manga series My Hero Academia
, a character in the manga series Death Note
, a character in the manga series Gravitation
, a character in the manga series Tomo-chan Is a Girl!
, a character in the dating sim Welcome to Pia Carrot
, a character in the visual novel Kanon
Yuri Aizawa, a character in the J-drama Pride

Japanese-language surnames